Kelsey Wilson (born January 22, 1986) is a retired Canadian professional ice hockey player.

On October 6, 2006, Wilson was signed as a free agent by the Nashville Predators, and on May 17, 2010, he was re-signed by Predators to a further one-year contract.  He played for their AHL affiliate, the Milwaukee Admirals.

On July 27, 2011, Wilson signed with the Toronto Maple Leafs organization.

In January 2014 Wilson signed to the EIHL team Coventry Blaze.

References

External links

1986 births
Living people
EC Red Bull Salzburg players
Guelph Storm players
Milwaukee Admirals players
Nottingham Panthers players
San Francisco Bulls players
Sarnia Sting players
Trenton Titans players
Toronto Marlies players
Utica Comets players
Canadian expatriate ice hockey players in England
Canadian expatriate ice hockey players in Austria
Canadian ice hockey left wingers